Skip Jones (born in Los Angeles, California
and raised in Utica, New York) is an American folk musician, storyteller and educator from Wisconsin, who writes and performs songs about a wide array of topics. He often promotes clean water, social harmony, and the old family values of shared music and time tested wisdom in his music, actions, and words.

Record labels 
Jones founded the record labels Makin' Jam, Etc., and Cabin in the Wood Recordings. Through these labels Jones was the producer and engineer for various artists and albums, for example Utah Phillips' The Old Guy and Moscow Hold; and Larry Long's Troubadour.

Discography 
All references from the FolkLib Index except when noted.

 Water is Life – For All My Relations (2016)
 Hear the Whistle Blow (2011)
 Life Is Delicious (2007)
 Sacred Sites Songs, compilation (2007)
 You Are My Sunshine
 Bring Back the Joy!, compilation (2004)
 Grandpa's River (2002)
 The Journey: Chapter 2: Don't Feed The Harmonica Player (2000)
 The Journey (2000)
 The Tellin' Takes Me Home
 Skip Jones & The Children of Dubuque (1992)
 Simply Folk Sampler 2 (1990)
 Long Hard Time
 Corners of My Mind (1985)

See also
 Walt Bresette
 Sparky and Rhonda Rucker
 Utah Phillips
 Guy Carawan
 Bill Staines
 Larry Long

References

External links
Skip Jones website
Skip Jones at Discogs

American folk singers
American male singer-songwriters
Living people
Year of birth missing (living people)
University of Wisconsin–Green Bay alumni
Record producers from Wisconsin
20th-century American singers
21st-century American singers
20th-century American male singers
21st-century American male singers
Singer-songwriters from Wisconsin